The Michigan Association for Justice (MAJ), formerly the Michigan Trial Lawyers Association (MTLA) is a professional association of over 1,400 plaintiff's attorneys and staff, with offices in Lansing, Michigan.

MAJ provides members with professional networking, online listserves, a data bank of relevant court documents and legal experts, and a member directory. The organization also provides an extensive continuing legal education (CLE) program in locations throughout Michigan. Additionally, MAJ's Lansing-based government affairs staff lobbies legislators and state agencies to advance a pro-civil justice legislative agenda, intended to preserve and enhance the rights of injured people.

MAJ states that it "promotes justice and fairness for injured persons, safeguards victims' rights--particularly the right to trial by jury--and strengthens the civil justice system through education and disclosure of information critical to public health and safety." It provides information and professional assistance to its members. It is headquartered in Lansing, Michigan.  The MAJ is an affiliated member of the American Association for Justice.

History

Past presidents

 1945 - 49	Samuel Charfoos (d)
 1949 - 53	Hon. Theodore R. Bohn 
 1953 - 55	Benjamin Marcus (d)
 1955 - 56	Carl Gussen (d)
 1956 - 57	James A. Markle (d)
 1957 - 58	Saul M. Leach 
 1958 - 59	Duane S. Van Benschoten (d)
 1959 - 60	I. Goodman Cohen (d)
 1960 - 61	D. Charles Marsten
 1961 - 62	Dean Robb
 1962 - 63	Max Dean
 1963 - 64	George L. Downing
 1964 - 65	Lee C. Dramis (d)
 1965 - 66	Howard Silver
 1966 - 67	James E. Burns (d)
 1967 - 68	Cassius E. Street
 1968 - 69	James W. Baker (d)
 1969 - 70	Eugene D. Mossner
 1970 - 71	Irving Kroll
 1971 - 72	Morton E. Schneider
 1972 - 74	Harry M. Philo
 1974 - 75	George Bedrosian
 1975 - 76	Sheldon L. Miller
 1976 - 77	James F. Logan
 1977 - 78	Clifford H. Hart
 1978 - 79	George M. Maurer, Jr.
 1979 - 80	Jack H. Bindes
 1980 - 81 	Jeffrey N. Shillman
 1981 - 82	Paul A. Rosen (d)
 1982 - 83	George T. Sinas
 1983 - 84	Beverly Clark
 1984 - 85	Sherwin Schreier
 1985 - 86	Nicholas J. Rine
 1986 - 87	Hon. William B. Murphy
 1987 - 88	Carl R. Edwards
 1988 - 89	Charles J. Barr
 1989 - 90	Sheldon D. Erlich
 1990 - 91	Barry Waldman
 1991 - 92	Thomas Hay
 1992 - 93	Marjory Cohen
 1993 - 94	Michael Pianin
 1994 - 95	Dave Getto
 1995 - 96	Mark Weiss (d)
 1996 - 97	Richard Skutt
 1997 - 98	Kathy Bogas
 1998 - 99	Carol McNeilage
 1999 - 2000	Barry Goodman
 2000 - 01	Jules Olsman
 2001 - 02	Norman Tucker
 2002 - 03	Alan Helmkamp
 2003 - 04	Brian Waldman
 2004 - 05	Michael Pitt
 2005 - 06	Linda Miller Atkinson
 2006 - 07	Jesse Reiter
 2007 - 08	Robert Raitt
 2008 - 09	Judy Susskind
 2009 - 10	Richard Warsh
 2010 - 11	Barry J. Gates
 2011 - 12	Michael J. Behm
 2012 - 13	Marc E. Lipton
 2013 - 14	Gerald H. Acker
 2014 - 15     Scott A. Goodwin
 2015 - 16     Ven R. Johnson
2016 - 17      Thomas W. Waun
2017 - 18      Brian J. McKeen
2018 - 19      Debra A. Freid
2019 - 20      Robert J. MacDonald
2020 - 21      Donna M. MacKenzie
2021 - 22     Ronald K. Weiner

Membership and governance

The MAJ is currently presided over by President Donna M. MacKenzie. She works with the other officers and MAJ Executive Director Steve Pontoni, who oversees the day-to-day operation of the organization.  The executive board, which meets throughout the year, is made up of 120 members including all past presidents.

References

Trade associations based in the United States
Michigan law